Neil Francis Ian McCallum (born 22 November 1977) is a Scottish cricketer. He made his first-class cricket debut on 11 May 2006, for Scotland against Namibia in the 2006–07 ICC Intercontinental Cup.

He is a right-handed batsman. He made his debut for Scotland on 4 July 2000 against an England Amateur team. McCallum has since represented Scotland in One Day International (ODI) matches, his first match at this level coming against Pakistan in June 2006. On 29 January 2007, he scored an unbeaten 102 as Scotland defeated Ireland in Nairobi. He became the second Scottish cricketer to score an ODI century after Ryan Watson.He along with Ryan Watson set the record for the highest ever partnership for any wicket in ODI history as debutants(118 for the 5th wicket). This is also the only stand in ODI history that two new debutants had a 100+ runs stand for any wicket in ODI cricket He was also nominated for Scotland's batsman of the year awards in 2006/2007. He also played cricket for Edinburgh-based Grange Cricket Club, appearing regularly for their first XIs, as a top order batsman. He currently works as a PE teacher at George Watson's College in Edinburgh, which he also attended as a pupil.

He holds the joint record with Kapil Dev for facing the most balls when batting at number six position in an ODI innings(138)

References

Scottish cricketers
Scotland One Day International cricketers
Scotland Twenty20 International cricketers
1977 births
Living people
People educated at George Watson's College
Staff of George Watson's College